The R.E. Olds Transportation Museum is named for Ransom E. Olds, founder of Oldsmobile and REO , and is located in Lansing, Michigan. It is one of the top-rated automotive museums in the United States.

It houses a diverse collection of Oldsmobiles dating from 1897 to 2004. The 1897 Olds, one of four built that year, is on loan from the Smithsonian Institution. There is also a replica of the 1893 steam carriage built by Ransom E. Olds on display, prior to the founding of the Olds Motor Works, which was the official name of Oldsmobile until the 1940s.

This museum also houses automobilia covering nearly a century, including a nearly complete collection of Michigan license plates, early traffic signs and a working 1950s-era traffic signal. A bicycle collection shows the connection between early automakers and cycle makers who had the tools, know-how and creativity to successfully produce an automobile.

It also houses a collection of REO vehicles from the company that Ransom E. Olds created after he resigned from Oldsmobile. A well-known vehicle from that company is the REO Speed Wagon, from which a major musical band got its name. Another well-known truck that was made by a successor of that company is the Diamond REO.

Another significant part of this museum's collection are items from the Ransom E. Olds household.

The final Oldsmobile, a dark cherry metallic "Final 500 Collector's Edition" (#500 of 500) Alero sedan, was on display in the museum, but the GM Heritage Center took it back where it is now located.

See also 

List of automobile museums
List of transport museums

References 
 R.E. Olds Transportation Museum
 MuseumsUSA listing

External links 
Museum Website

Oldsmobile
Automobile museums in Michigan
Museums in Lansing, Michigan
Transportation in Lansing, Michigan